Campoletis sonorensis is a species of parasitoid ichneumonid wasp found in much of the Americas, including the United States, Brazil, and Chile. Hosts include Spodoptera frugiperda, Spodoptera exigua, Helicoverpa, and Chrysodeixis includens.

References

Campopleginae
Biological pest control wasps
Hymenoptera of North America
Hymenoptera of South America
Insects described in 1886